Hunter Dekkers (born July 4, 2001) is an American football quarterback who currently plays for the Iowa State Cyclones.

Early life and high school
Dekkers grew up in Hawarden, Iowa on a cattle farm. He attended West Sioux High School, where he was a member of the football, basketball, baseball, and track teams. Dekkers set Iowa his school career records for most passing yards with 10,628 and touchdown passes with 126. Dekkers committed to play college football at Iowa State after considering offers from Purdue, Kansas State, and Indiana.

College career
Dekkers played in three games as a true freshman before redshirting the season and completed five of seven pass attempts for 114 yards and one touchdown and also rushed for a touchdown. He spent his redshirt freshman season as the backup to starter Brock Purdy completed 20 of 36 passes for 193 yards and two touchdowns and also rushed four times for 61 yards and one touchdown in four games. Dekkers was named Iowa State's starter entering his redshirt sophomore season.

Statistics

References

External links
 Iowa State Cyclones profile

2001 births
Living people
Players of American football from Iowa
American football quarterbacks
Iowa State Cyclones football players